City of New Orleans is the 31st studio album by country musician Willie Nelson, released by Columbia Records.  The title track was written and originally recorded by Steve Goodman; his version was released in 1971. The next year, Arlo Guthrie became the first to have a hit with the song. Nelson's version topped the U.S. country singles chart.  Other covers featured on the album include "Please Come to Boston" and "Wind Beneath My Wings".

Track listing
"City of New Orleans" (Steve Goodman) - 4:47
"Just Out of Reach" (Virgil "Pappy" Stewart) - 3:37
"Good Time Charlie's Got the Blues" (Danny O'Keefe) - 2:52
"Why Are You Pickin' On Me" (Willie Nelson) - 2:26
"She's Out of My Life" (Tom Bahler) - 3:26
"Cry" (Churchill Kohlman) - 3:32
"Please Come to Boston" (Dave Loggins) - 4:17
"It Turns Me Inside Out" (Jan Crutchfield) - 3:27
"Wind Beneath My Wings" (Larry Henley, Jeff Silbar) - 3:46
"Until It's Time for You to Go" (Buffy Sainte-Marie) - 4:06

Production
 Recorded at: Moman's Recording Studio.

Personnel
Willie Nelson - vocals, guitar
Reggie Young, J.R. Cobb, Chips Moman - guitar
 Mike Leech - bass guitar
 Bobby Emmons, Bobby Wood - keyboards 
 Gene Chrisman - drums 
 Mickey Raphael - harmonica
 Wayne Jackson - trumpet
 Donald Sanders - baritone saxophone
 Jon Marett - alto saxophone
 Toni Wine, Rick Yancey, Andy Black, Sherill Parks, Bobby Wood, J.R. Cobb, Chips Moman - backing vocals
 The A Strings - strings

Charts

Weekly charts

Year-end charts

Certifications

References

1984 albums
Willie Nelson albums
Columbia Records albums
Covers albums
Albums produced by Chips Moman